The Big Country is a comic book adaptation and movie tie-in of the western novel The Big Country by Donald Hamilton.

Publication history
Written by long-time Western comics writer Paul S. Newman, and drawn by Bob Correa, The Big Country was initially serialized in The Saturday Evening Post as "Ambush at Blanco Canyon" on February 2, 9, 16 and 23, 1957.

The story was collected for the first time in 1958, by Dell, as a Dell First Edition B115 paperback, and was reissued many times. In Aug. of 1958, the story was published by Dell Comics, as issue #946 of Dell's long-running showcase anthology Four Color Comics.

The Big Country was published in hardcover in the UK in 1958 by Allan Wingate.

Plot summary
Maryland sea captain James McKay goes west to Texas, to claim his bride, and steps into a violent feud over land. The movie version stars Gregory Peck, Charlton Heston, Jean Simmons, Carroll Baker and Burl Ives.

References

1958 comics debuts
1958 comics endings
Comics based on films
Comics based on novels
Western (genre) comics